The Kells Water is a small river in County Antrim, Northern Ireland. It flows through Moorfields and Kells and is a tributary to the River Main. The river rises above Glenwherry. It is a continuation of the Glenwhirry River and eventually joins the Main, which in turn flows into Lough Neagh. The hamlet of Kellswater is nearby. An old stone bridge crosses the Kells Water, separating Kells from the adjacent village of Connor.

Angling
The Kells Water is a nursery river, which salmon, trout and dollaghan use to spawn in November and December.

History
The river was widely used to power linen and other mills in the past. The water is still used in some industrial processes, such as in a dye works near Connor.

Culture
Kellswater Flute Band was founded in 1947, four miles south of Ballymena in the town land  of Tullynamullan. The band takes its name not from the area but from the river Kells Water, immortalised in the song Bonnie Kellswater, the river and the bridge featuring on the band crest.

See also
List of rivers of Northern Ireland

References

External links

Rivers of County Antrim